The women's 15 kilometre freestyle cross-country skiing competition at the 1994 Winter Olympics in Lillehammer, Norway, was held on 13 February at Birkebeineren Ski Stadium.

Results
The results:

References

External links
Results International Ski Federation

Women's cross-country skiing at the 1994 Winter Olympics
Women's 15 kilometre cross-country skiing at the Winter Olympics